He Said, She Said is a Canadian cooking television show featuring popular Canadian personalities Ken Kostick and Mary Jo Eustace. The show debuted on July 2, 2008 on W Network and currently airs Monday to Friday at 3:30AM, 11:30AM and 1:30PM ET on VIVA. It is produced by Up Front Entertainment and filmed in Toronto, Ontario.

Premise
The premise of the show is that each host cooks a different style dish featuring one common ingredient called the "star ingredient". Along with the main dish, a second dish is also prepared called the "High 5", a side dish that contains only five ingredients.

What's For Dinner?
An earlier cooking show called What's for Dinner? - at the time the highest rated show on its network, also featured the quick-witted, bantering Kostick and Eustace. The earlier show aired for several years in the mid to late '90s.

External links
 Official website

2008 Canadian television series debuts
2000s Canadian cooking television series
W Network original programming